Tetela may refer to:

 Democratic Republic of the Congo:
Tetela people
Tetela language

 Mexico:
Tetela del Volcán, Morelos
Tetela, Oaxaca
Tetela de Ocampo, Puebla
Tetela de Xonotla, Puebla
Los Ángeles Tetela, Puebla
San Baltazar Tetela, Puebla